United and Republican Left was a Valencian electoral alliance formed by United Left of the Valencian Country (EUPV) and Republican Left (IR) to contest the 2008 Spanish general election in the Valencian Community. The list was led by Antonio Montalbán.

Composition

References

Defunct political party alliances in Spain